The North American Boxing Federation (NABF) is a not-for-profit regional sanctioning body that awards regional boxing titles. It is a boxing federation within the World Boxing Council (WBC).

History
The WBC established the NABF in 1969 as part of its creation of a variety of regional boxing federations. These regional federations would sanction championship bouts and crown regional champions. These champions would be given consideration in the world rankings put out by the WBC. The first NABF title bout was between Sonny Liston and Leotis Martin on December 6, 1969.

According to the International Boxing Research Organization, "the appearance of the NABF in 1969 marked the start of major 12-round title bouts in western countries..."

Current champions

Male

Female

Other regional WBC federations
Oriental and Pacific Boxing Federation (OPBF)
European Boxing Union (EBU)
Asian Boxing Council (ABCO)
African Boxing Union (ABU)
Caribbean Boxing Federation (CABOFE)
Central American Boxing Federation (FECARBOX)
CIS and Slovenian Boxing Bureau (CISBB)
South American Boxing Federation (FESUBOX)

See also
List of NABF champions

References

External links

Professional boxing organizations
Boxing in North America
World Boxing Council
Sports organizations established in 1969